The 2022–23 Macedonian Football Cup is the 31st season of North Macedonia's football knockout competition. Makedonija GP will be the defending champions, having won their third title in the previous year.

Competition calendar

First round
The draw was held on 28 July 2022.

|colspan="3" style="background-color:#97DEFF" align=center|14 September 2022

|-
|colspan="3" style="background-color:#97DEFF" align=center|N/A

Second round
The draw was held on 16 September 2022.

|colspan="3" style="background-color:#97DEFF" align=center|5 October 2022

|-
|colspan="3" style="background-color:#97DEFF" align=center|19 October 2022

Quarter-finals
The draw was held on 25 October 2022.

|colspan="3" style="background-color:#97DEFF" align=center|9 November 2022

1 The match was abandoned on 9th minute at the result 0–1, due to the clash between home fans and players of the away team.

Semi-finals
The draw was held on 14 March 2023.

Summary

|colspan="3" style="background-color:#97DEFF" align=center|5 April 2023

Matches

Season statistics

Top Scorers

See also 
 2022–23 Macedonian First Football League
 2022–23 Macedonian Second Football League

References

External links 
Football Federation of Macedonia 
MacedonianFootball.com 

North Macedonia
Cup
Macedonian Football Cup seasons